West Virginia contains a network of eight state forests that help to protect over  of wooded lands in the state.  Most of the forests are managed by the West Virginia Division of Forestry, although Kanawha State Forest is managed as a state park by the Division of Natural Resources.  All of the forests except for Calvin Price contain recreational facilities managed in cooperation with the DNR.

West Virginia state forests

See also

List of U.S. National Forests
List of West Virginia state parks 
List of West Virginia wildlife management areas

References

 
State forests
West Virginia
State Forests, List of West Virginia